Wilson Assembly of God, founded in 1922, is one of the oldest churches in the state of Oklahoma affiliated with the Assemblies of God USA. The Assemblies of God began in 1917 in Arkansas. The church has been an integral part of Wilson, Oklahoma, and the surrounding areas. The Wilson Museum has many articles relating to the ministry and the pastors of this church.

External links
 Wilson Assembly of God
 City Data Church Picture1
 City Data Church Picture2
 Google Map Wilson Assembly of God

Pentecostal churches in Oklahoma
Christian organizations established in 1922